Marita may refer to:

 Marita (hippo), a fictional character on the television series Animaniacs
 Marita Covarrubias, a fictional character on the television series The X-Files
 Battle of Greece, also known as Operation Marita

People with the given name Marita:

 Marita Aronson (born 1939), Swedish politician
 Marita Bonner (1899–1971), African-American writer
 Marita Conlon-McKenna (born 1956), Irish writer
 Marita Crawley (born 1954), British songwriter and playwright
 Marita Dotterweich (21st century), German cross-country skier
 Marita Geraghty (born 1965), American television character actress
 Marita Grabiak (21st century), American television director
 Marita Johansson (born 1984), Swedish speed skater
 Marita Koch (born 1957), East German athlete
 Marita Lange (born 1943), East German athlete
 Marita Liabø (born 1971), Norwegian author
 Marita Lindahl (1938–2017), Miss World 1957
 Marita Liulia (born 1957), Finnish media artist and director
 Marita Lorenz (born 1939), German woman
 Marita Mathijsen (born 1944), Dutch academic
 Marita Payne (born 1960), Canadian athlete
 Marita Petersen (1940–2001), Prime Minister of the Faroe Islands
 Marita Ruoho (born 1949), Finnish orienteer
 Marita Skogum (born 1961), Swedish orienteer
 Marita Ulvskog (born 1951), Swedish politician
 Marita Zobel (born 1941), Filipina actress

Other uses 
 Mariţa (disambiguation), various things in Romania
 Marita (gastropod), a genus of sea snails

Feminine given names

hu:Marita
pl:Marita